Tommy Streeter, Jr. (born October 7, 1989) is a former American football wide receiver. He played college football at the University of Miami and was drafted by the Baltimore Ravens in the sixth round of the 2012 NFL Draft, with whom he won Super Bowl XLVII.

College career
As a junior, Streeter led the Miami Hurricanes in receptions with 46,811 receiving yards, and eight touchdowns. On December 5, 2011, he announced that he would forgo his senior season and enter the 2012 NFL Draft.

Professional career

Baltimore Ravens
Streeter was drafted to the Baltimore Ravens in the sixth round, 198th Overall, of the 2012 NFL Draft. On August 31, 2012, he was placed on Injured Reserve because of a foot injury.

On August 25, 2013, he was waived by the Ravens.

Tampa Bay Buccaneers
On September 1, 2013, he signed with the Tampa Bay Buccaneers as a member of their practice squad. The Buccaneers released Streeter on August 24, 2014.

Miami Dolphins
On August 31, 2014, he signed with the Miami Dolphins as a member of their practice squad. He was released on September 23, 2014, to make room for Marcus Thigpen.

Jacksonville Jaguars
On September 29, 2014, he signed to the Jacksonville Jaguars practice squad. On November 29, 2014, he was promoted to their active roster after waiving wide receiver Mike Brown.

Miami Dolphins (second stint) 
On June 8, 2015, he signed with the Miami Dolphins. However, after being put on injured reserve, he was waived on August 15, 2015.

Hamilton Tiger-Cats 
On August 25, 2016, Streeter signed with the Hamilton Tiger-Cats of the Canadian Football League (CFL).

Saskatchewan Roughriders 
Streeter was part of a four-player trade in October 2016 which saw him traded to the Saskatchewan Roughriders.

References

External links

Tampa Bay Buccaneers bio 
Miami Hurricanes bio 
Baltimore Ravens bio

1989 births
Living people
Miami Northwestern Senior High School alumni
Players of American football from Miami
American football wide receivers
Canadian football wide receivers
American players of Canadian football
Miami Hurricanes football players
Baltimore Ravens players
Buffalo Bills players
Tampa Bay Buccaneers players
Miami Dolphins players
Jacksonville Jaguars players
Hamilton Tiger-Cats players
Saskatchewan Roughriders players
Players of Canadian football from Miami